The 1944 United States presidential election in Florida  was held on November 7, 1944. Voters chose eight electors, or representatives to the Electoral College, who voted for president and vice president.

Incumbent Franklin D. Roosevelt carried the Sunshine State by a landslide large margin of 40.64 percentage points, or 196,162 votes, over Republican Thomas Dewey, receiving Florida's eight electoral votes. This constitutes the last time that a Democratic presidential nominee has won more than 60% of the vote in Florida, as well as the last time that a Democrat has swept every county in the state.

This election marked the end of Florida's status as a one-party Democratic "Solid South" state. The subsequent combination of mass migration–especially of retirees–from the historically Republican North, in addition to increasing Democratic liberalism on racial policies, would gradually turn the state into a bellwether starting in 1948.

, this remains the last time that the following counties have ever supported a Democratic presidential nominee: Indian River, Lake, Lee, Manatee, Martin and Sarasota. Orange County, containing Orlando, would not vote Democratic again until 2000, while Palm Beach County would not vote Democratic again until 1992, and Broward County not until 1976.

Results

Results by county

References

Notes

Florida
1944 Florida elections
1944